Stoneleigh Manor is a historic apartment building at the northwest corner of Michigan Avenue and Main Street in Evanston, Illinois. The three-story brick building was built in 1913. Architect John A. Nyden, an Evanston resident who designed several apartment buildings in the city, designed the building in the Prairie School style. The building's design includes canopied entrances flanked by columns and leadlights, limestone banding, and wide overhanging eaves. Each floor of the building has four rooms, which included amenities such as sunrooms, fireplaces, a vacuum cleaning system, and maid's rooms in some units.

The building was added to the National Register of Historic Places on March 15, 1984.

References

Buildings and structures on the National Register of Historic Places in Cook County, Illinois
Residential buildings on the National Register of Historic Places in Illinois
Buildings and structures in Evanston, Illinois
Apartment buildings in Illinois
Prairie School architecture in Illinois
Residential buildings completed in 1913